Wednesday is an American band from Asheville, North Carolina, currently signed to Dead Oceans. The band consists of vocalist Karly Hartzman, guitarist Jake Lenderman, lap steel player Xandy Chelmis, and drummer Alan Miller. Wednesday was formed in 2017 as Karly Hartzman's personal songwriting project.

Career
Hartzman was inspired to start playing guitar after watching Mitski's NPR Tiny Desk concert. Hartzman attended college in Asheville, where she met Daniel Gorham. The two recorded an album together under the moniker Wednesday titled yep definitely. The band's name was inspired by the British band The Sundays.

After releasing this record, Hartzman formed another band called Diva Sweetly, alongside members of the band Pictures of Vernon. Hartzman was interested in making shoegaze music, which was not the music Diva Sweetly was making. Thus, Hartzman gathered new members to join the Wednesday band and released the second album with the group, titled I Was Trying to Describe You to Someone in 2020. The group released their third record, Twin Plagues, on August 13, 2021.

On March 11, 2022, the band released a covers album titled Mowing the Leaves Instead of Piling 'em Up, featuring covers versions of songs by Gary Stewart, Chris Bell, Roger Miller, Drive-By Truckers, Hotline TNT, Greg Sage, Vic Chesnutt, Medicine and The Smashing Pumpkins. On September 8, 2022, the band left Orindal Records and signed to Dead Oceans, releasing the single "Bull Believer". On January 18, 2023, the band released the single "Chosen to Deserve" and announced a fifth album, Rat Saw God, scheduled for release on April 7, 2023.

Discography

Studio albums

Live albums

Extended plays

Singles

References

Musical groups established in 2017
Musical groups from Asheville, North Carolina
Indie rock musical groups from North Carolina
American country rock groups
American shoegaze musical groups
2017 establishments in North Carolina
Dead Oceans artists